Naresh Dalal is a physical chemist who specializes in materials science.  He is the Dirac Professor of Chemistry and Biochemistry at Florida State University, where he is affiliated with the National High Magnetic Field Laboratory. Dalal has synthesized Fe8, one of the strongest magnets known, which has allowed new kinds of medical imaging to be possible.

Research
Dalal has written or co-written more than 400 publications for peer-reviewed journals that have been cited over 7,000 times. He is the co-principal investigator on a National Science Foundation grant award for investigating photo-responsive molecules that can translate the action of heat, pressure, or light irradiation into substantial changes in the magnetic and structural properties of materials.

Dalal's research group focuses on:
 Studying the physical properties of solid-state materials
 Development of new materials (superconductors, highly correlated electron spin systems, molecular magnets, ferroics, etc.)
 Understanding of structure-property relationships
 Obtaining guidelines for developing new materials
 Development of novel applications or improvement of existing instrumental methods (high field EPR probe design, NMR methods, etc.)

Honors
Dalal received Florida State University's highest faculty honor when he was named 2012-2013 Robert O. Lawton Distinguished Professor. In 2010, Dalal received the Silver Medal for Physics/Materials Science from the International Electron Paramagnetic Resonance Society. In 2007, he received the Florida Chemistry award from the Florida Section of the American Chemical Society, and the Southern Chemist Award from the Memphis Section of the American Chemical Society.

After being nominated by the Division of Chemical Physics in 2000 for the development of multiple resonance methods and their applications in molecular dynamics and ferroelectric phase transitions, Dalal was named a fellow by the American Physical Society. He was then elevated to the rank of American Chemical Society fellow in 2010.

References

External links 
 Florida State University faculty profile
 National High Magnetic Field Laboratory profile
 2010 Silver Medal

Florida State University faculty
American physical chemists
American materials scientists
Living people
American Jains
American academics of Indian descent
Fellows of the American Physical Society
Fellows of the American Chemical Society
Year of birth missing (living people)
Indian scholars